"New Romantics" is a song by American singer-songwriter Taylor Swift, taken from the deluxe edition of her fifth studio album, 1989 (2014). It was written by Swift alongside its producers, Max Martin and Shellback. The song's title is a reference to the New Romantic cultural movement of the late 1970s and 1980s; the new wave musical style of that era influenced the song's synth-pop production. The lyrics find Swift reigniting her hopes and energy after having endured emotional hardships. "New Romantics" was made available for digital download as a promotional single on March 3, 2015, by Big Machine Records. It was released to US radio as the seventh and final single from 1989 on February 23, 2016, by Republic Records in partnership with Big Machine.

The song's music video, a compilation of footage from the 1989 World Tour, was released as an Apple Music exclusive on April 6, 2016. The single peaked at number 46 on the US Billboard Hot 100, and entered the top 40 on record charts in Australia, Belgian Flanders, Lebanon, and Scotland. It received gold certifications in Australia and the US. Many critics lamented the song's exclusion from 1989 standard edition, hailing the energetic and lively atmosphere of "New Romantics" and ranking it as one of Swift's best songs; a few others however deemed it a forgettable track. Rolling Stone in 2019 included the track on their list of the 100 best songs of the 2010s decade.

Production
Inspired by 1980s synth-pop, singer-songwriter Taylor Swift moved away from the country-styled music of her previous releases to employ a straightforward pop production for her fifth studio album, 1989 (2014). To this end, she enlisted prominent mainstream pop producers, including Swedish hitmakers Max Martin and Shellback; Swift also recruited the former as co-executive producer. Martin and Shellback produced seven out of thirteen tracks on the album's standard edition, and two out of three bonus tracks on the deluxe edition, including "New Romantics". Swift, Martin and Shellback are credited as the songwriters of "New Romantics". The song was recorded by Michael Ilbert at MXM Studios in Stockholm, Sweden, and Sam Holland at Conway Recording Studios in Los Angeles. It was mixed by Serban Ghenea at MixStar Studios in Virginia Beach, Virginia, and mastered by Tom Coyne at Sterling Sound Studios in New York City.

Music and lyrics

"New Romantics" incorporates heavy, pulsating synthesizers. The song's title is a reference to the New Romantic cultural movement of the late 1970s and 1980s. According to Slate editor Forrest Wickman, this reference is also apparent through the song's sonic resemblance to the era's new wave. Critic Rob Sheffield of Rolling Stone dubbed "New Romantics" the song that showcases the most authentic tribute to 1980s synth-pop on 1989. AllMusic's Stephen Thomas Erlewine similarly considered the track among the few on the album that truly sounds like 1980s pop, specifically "1983 new wave". For Corey Baesley from PopMatters, "New Romantics" is where Swift emulates the "indie electro-pop" styles of Scottish band Chvrches. While acknowledging the 1980s influences, such as the "coolness" of the 1980 hit "We Got the Beat", music professor James Perone opined that "New Romantics" is musically "more about the pop music of the 21st century" than about the prevailing styles of the New Romantic era.

The lyrics are about Swift reigniting her hopes and energy after the heartbreak she had endured. In the views of Pitchfork reviewer Vrinda Jagota, "New Romantics" is where Swift brushes off the pain "into a night of uninhibited hedonism", representing her departure from "slow-burning heartache" on her previous songs towards a more positive, laid-back attitude. The refrain starts with Swift singing, "'Cause baby I could build a castle / Out of all the bricks they threw at me." Anna Leszkiewicz from the New Statesman commented that the "castle" imagery in "New Romantics", which are used in a "self-referential way", departed from the fairytale notion of "castles" on Swift's previous songs. The lyrics, "Heartbreak is the national anthem, we sing it proudly / We are too busy dancing to get knocked off our feet," find Swift celebrating the joys of youth, a theme that Emily Yahr from Stuff compared to Swift's previous single "22" (2013). Slate critic Carl Wilson described the song as 1989 representation of Swift's new attitude towards romance. The lyric, "The best people in life are free," sees Swift no longer seeking revenge on ex-lovers. Perone noted that the lyrics were representational of Swift's generation's defiant and carefree attitude, which he compared to that of the mods in the 1960s, specifically citing the Who's 1965 song "My Generation".

Release and commercial performance

"New Romantics" was initially one of the three bonus tracks on the deluxe edition of 1989, which was available exclusively at Target in the United States. On February 17, 2015, Swift announced that she would release the three bonus tracks to iTunes Stores in the United States as promotional singles one at a time. "New Romantics" was released on March 3, 2015, by Big Machine Records. Following this release, the song entered the US Billboard Hot 100 chart dated March 21, 2015, at number 71.

On February 19, 2016, Swift announced that "New Romantics" would be the seventh and final single from 1989. Republic Records in partnership with Big Machine released the song to US contemporary hit and hot adult contemporary radio stations on February 23. Upon its single release, "New Romantics" debuted at number 28 on the Mainstream Top 40/Pop Songs, a Billboard component chart, where it later peaked at number 18. The song peaked at number 46 on the Billboard Hot 100 chart dated April 30, 2016, and spent eight weeks on the chart. The single reached the top 40 on charts in Lebanon (18), Belgian Flanders (33), Australia (35), and Scotland (40). "New Romantics" received a gold certification from the Recording Industry Association of America (RIAA) for exceeding 500,000 track-equivalent units, based on sales and on-demand streams. It also received a gold certification by the Australian Recording Industry Association (ARIA), which indicates 35,000 units. The song received a nomination for Choice Song – Female Artist at the 2016 Teen Choice Awards.

On April 6, Swift released the music video for "New Romantics" exclusively on Apple Music, which required a paid subscription. The video consists of concert and behind-the-scenes footage during the 1989 World Tour in 2015, intertwined with Swift's voice-overs about her thoughts for her fans. Laura Bertens, a scholar in art history and cultural studies, cited "New Romantics" as an example of "why music videos often elicit strong reactions". Bertens noted that the behind-the-scenes footage of Swift's performances made the audience connect with her on a personal level, "to see the private person behind the celebrity, all the while knowing that we are looking at a performance as well". Complex Jessie Morris deemed the exclusive Apple release part of Swift's "partnership" with Apple Music, with whom Swift had collaborated on advertisements and interviews. The Sydney Morning Herald Karl Quinn labeled the release a "cynical move", through which Swift implicitly encouraged her fans to subscribe to Apple Music to balance the competition with Spotify—the largest on-demand streaming platform at the time. Swift had publicly condemned Spotify's free streaming services that provided low royalties for artists. Swift made the video available on her Vevo and YouTube accounts on April 13, 2016, without subscription requirements.

Swift included "New Romantics" on the set list for the 1989 World Tour, which ran from May to November 2015. She also performed the song at the Formula 1 United States Grand Prix at the Circuit of the Americas on October 22, 2016, and at the DirecTV Super Saturday Night, as part of a series of pre-Super Bowl concerts, on February 4, 2017.

Critical reception
Upon the release of 1989, Corey Beasley from PopMatters deemed "New Romantics" and the other two deluxe edition bonus tracks more "compositionally daring" than any track on the standard edition. Beasley favorably likened the song to the works of Chvrches, writing that "[Swift] can do it better than anyone else". Slate Carl Wilson called it "manifesto-toned", and Pitchfork Vrinda Jagota described the track as a "surging, euphoric" number that captures the essence of the album. Josh Duboff from Vanity Fair lamented the song's exclusion from the standard edition of 1989, writing that it could end up as an album track "on pretty much any other 2014 pop star's album". Aimee Cliff from Fact noted that even though the lyrics are about Swift's familiar theme of "documenting memories as romantic, filtered snapshots", "New Romantics" signaled a maturity in Swift's songwriting.

Rob Sheffield of Rolling Stone ranked "New Romantics" as the second best song of 2014, writing: "I have no idea why she left a song this urgent and glittery and perfect off her album ... but geniuses are weird." In his ranking of Swift's songs, Sheffield ranked it the second greatest song of Swift's career, labeling it as a "work of genius, exceeding even the wildest hopes any fan could have dreamed". Rolling Stone magazine placed "New Romantics" at number 58 among "The 100 Best Songs of the 2010s". Critic Brittany Spanos described it as "the type of relieving dance floor soul purge that the best pop can be". Retrospective reviews from The Guardian Alexis Petridis, NME Hannah Mylrae and Paste Jane Song commented that the song should have made the final cut of 1989 standard edition. Lucy Ford from British GQ ranked the single among Swift's 10 best and praised its "cheeky and winking" theme.

In less enthusiastic reviews, Nate Jones from Vulture called "New Romantics" a failed attempt at "writing a big generational anthem." Chris Richards of The Washington Post said that the song "registers somewhere between moldy emo and the back pages of a high school literary magazine", containing some of the "worst lyrics" on 1989.

Credits and personnel
Credits are adapted from the liner notes of 1989.

 Taylor Swift – vocals, background vocals, songwriter
 Max Martin – producer, songwriter, keyboard, piano, programming
 Shellback – producer, songwriter, background vocals, guitar, keyboards, drum, programming, bass
 Michael Ilbert – recording
 Sam Holland – recording
 Cory Bice – assistant recording
 Serban Ghenea – mixing
 John Hanes – engineered for mix
 Tom Coyne – mastering

Charts

Certifications

References

Citations

Cited literature

2014 songs
2016 singles
Song recordings produced by Max Martin
Song recordings produced by Shellback (record producer)
Songs written by Shellback (record producer)
Songs written by Max Martin
Songs written by Taylor Swift
American synth-pop songs
Taylor Swift songs
Big Machine Records singles
Music videos directed by Jonas Åkerlund